"Take Me In" is Bonnie Pink's seventeenth single from the album Just a Girl. The single was released under the East West Japan label on February 7, 2001.

Track listing
Take Me In
What About Me?
Passion Fruit

Charts

2001 singles
2001 songs
Bonnie Pink songs
Songs written by Bonnie Pink